Venafi, Inc. is a privately held cybersecurity company that develops software to secure and protect cryptographic keys and digital certificates.  Its enterprise key and certificate management and security products are certificate authority (CA) independent and manage security instruments such as Transport Layer Security (TLS) digital certificates and Secure Shell (SSH) keys. Venafi does not sell encryption and it is not a certificate authority.

Venafi reports a customer base of public- and private-sector entities, mostly Global 5000 organizations that operate in a variety of industries. Venafi is headquartered in Salt Lake City, Utah, and has offices in California and the United Kingdom.

History
Russell Thornton and Ben Hodson, both University of Washington graduates, cofounded Venafi's predecessor company in 1998 after recognizing that a consulting project they worked on had broader a commercial application. The cofounders incorporated the company as IMCentric in Washington State on October 26, 2000.

Seeking an infusion of angel capital, Hodson and Thornton moved the company to Utah where they were joined by Jayson Seegmiller. Hodson led engineering while Thornton and Seegmiller focused on business and operations. An application was filed to conduct business as IMCentric, Inc. in Orem, Utah on March 18, 2003. Thornton filed to change IMCentric's state of incorporation (home state) from Washington to Delaware on April 1, 2004.

In early 2005, the company changed its name from IMCentric to Venafi. It also changed its leadership from Thornton (president and chief executive officer) and Seegmiller (vice president, secretary, and treasurer) to Trell Rohovit (president and chief executive officer), William Clay Epstein (vice president), and Darren Denning (secretary). That year, the company also moved its headquarters to Sandy, Utah. 

Jeff Hudson (current chief executive officer) replaced Rohovit in October 2010, and the company moved to Salt Lake City, UT in 2013.

Company name
Venafi is a made-up word created by combining two Latin roots—Vena (vein or root) and Fides (trust or faith). Venafi secures the root of trust—the encryption keys and certificates.

Industry affiliations
Venafi is a participating organization with the Payment Card Industry Security Standards Council (PCI SSC), which issues the Payment Card Industry Data Security Standard (PCI DSS). Venafi submitted Cryptographic Keys and Digital Certificate Security Guidelines as a Special Interest Group (SIG) topic for consideration as both a 2015 and 2016 PCI SSC SIG. The topic was selected as a finalist for both a 2015 SIG (1 of 7 finalists, not selected) and a 2016 SIG (1 of 5 finalists, not selected). Venafi is also a member of the Financial Services - Information Sharing and Analysis group (FS-ISAC).

In July 2012, Paul Turner, then Venafi's vice president of product and strategy, co-authored a National Institute of Standards and Technology (NIST) Information Technology Laboratory (ITL) bulletin (“ITL Bulletin for July 2012: Preparing for and Responding to Certification Authority Compromise and Fraudulent Certificate Issuance”) that provides best practices-based information. In 2015, Turner teamed again with NIST to document best practices for "Security of Interactive and Automated Access Management Using Secure Shell (SSH).".

Honors & awards
In April 2014, SC Magazine Awards 2014 Europe named Venafi a finalist in its Best Encryption Solution and Best Risk/Policy Management Solution categories.
 In 2013, global media company, Red Herring, included Venafi software on its 2013 Top 100 North America: Winners, listing Venafi in the top North American private companies.
 In February 2013, SC Magazine Awards Europe 2013 named Venafi Director a finalist in its Best Encryption Solution and Best Security Management categories.
 In 2013, Info Security awarded Venafi Encryption Director Certificate Manager a Bronze Winner in the Risk Management category.
In May 2012, Venafi Director won a Software and Information Industry Association (SIIA) Codie award for the Best Security Solution category (Business Software).
 In February 2012, Venafi was nominated by eWeek Labs as one of thirteen “Hottest Security Vendors” at the RSA Conference in San Francisco.
 In February 2012, Venafi Encryption Director 6: Certificate Manager won Info Security's Global Excellence award in the Risk Management category.
 In 2011, Venafi Encryption Director won a spot in the Info Security's 2011 Global Excellence Award's finalist list in the Policy Management category.
In 2011, SC Magazine awarded Venafi Encryption Director a place on its SC Magazine Awards 2011 Europe finalist list.
In November 2011, Gartner, an information technology research and advisory company, acknowledged in its research note “X.509 Certificate Management: Avoiding Downtime and Brand Damage” that “Venafi is the leader in X.509 certificate management for internal and external systems and applications. Unlike certificate authority certificate management solutions, Venafi supports virtually all certificate issuers natively and can renew certificates from nearly any type of certificate issuer, providing flexibility for complex heterogeneous environments composed of certificates issued by various certificate authorities.”
In 2010, SC Magazine awarded Venafi its 2010 Industry Innovator distinction.
In April 2010, Gartner named Venafi a “Cool Vendor in Data and Infrastructure Protection.”
In 2009, Venafi Director won Info Security's 2009 Global Excellence award in the Best New Software Product category.
In October 2007, Venafi was listed as one of the 10 IT security companies to watch by InfoWorld.
In October 2004, IMCentric, Venafi's predecessor, was recognized as one of Utah's top 20 High-Tech companies by Utah Business Magazine.
In 2021, Venfai’s Trust Protection Platform won the “Identity Management Platform of the Year” award in the Cybersecurity Breakthrough Awards.

References

Computer security companies
Software companies based in Utah
Computer security software companies
Software companies of the United States
2000 establishments in Utah